Lieutenant-Colonel Arthur Balfour Haig, CMG, CVO (10 July 1840 – 15 April 1925) was a British Army officer, courtier, and Conservative Party political agent.

A second cousin of Field-Marshal the Earl Haig, Arthur Balfour Haig was educated at Rugby School and the Royal Military Academy, Woolwich. Commissioned into the Royal Engineers in 1859, he came to the notice of Queen Victoria and served in the household of Prince Alfred, Duke of Edinburgh and later Duke of Saxe-Coburg and Gotha, from 1864 until Prince Alfred's death in 1880. In April 1902 Haig was appointed an extra equerry to King Edward VII, and after the King′s death, he was appointed to a similar position to his successor King George V.

Haig was appointed a Commander of the Royal Victorian Order (CVO) in the November 1902 Birthday Honours list, and was invested with the insignia by King Edward VII at Buckingham Palace on 18 December 1902.

Having served as Conservative Party agent for Scotland for 15 years, Haig was Principal Agent of the Conservative Party from 1905 to 1906.

He was the 28th Laird of Clan Haig.

References 

Equerries
1925 deaths
Royal Engineers officers
Companions of the Order of St Michael and St George
Commanders of the Royal Victorian Order
Scottish justices of the peace
Conservative Party (UK) officials
Graduates of the Royal Military Academy, Woolwich
People educated at Rugby School